Carrero may refer to:
 Aimee Carrero (born 1988), Dominican actress
 Beto Carrero (1937–2008), Brazilian theme park owner and entertainer
 Daniel Gómez Carrero (born 1990), Spanish singer, known professionally as Kaydy Cain
 Hilda Carrero (1951–2002), Venezuelan beauty queen
 Leonardo Carrero (born 1992), Venezuelan model and male beauty pageant titleholder
 Lenore Carrero Nesbitt (1932–2001), American lawyer and judge.
 Luis Carrero Blanco (1904–1973), Spanish military officer and politician
 Mario Carrero (born 1952), Uruguayan musician
 Nelson Carrero (born 1953), Venezuelan football player and manager
 Russel Carrero (1950–1990), Nicaraguan athlete
 Tico Carrero (born 1948), Puerto Rican tennis player
 Tônia Carrero (1922–2018), Brazilian actress
 Yaniel Carrero (born 1995), Cuban athlete

Spanish-language surnames